Lists of Philippine actors cover actors from the Philippines. The lists are organized by age and gender.

 List of Filipino current child actors
 List of Filipino former child actors
 List of Filipino actresses
 List of Filipino male actors